James Henry Griffiths (4 January 1931 – 25 April 1978) was a Welsh professional footballer and football manager. In his time at Swansea he filled multiple roles, as player, physio, coach, trainer, assistant manager and manager. As a player, he made 421 appearances for Swansea Town scored 72 goals, and was also capped by Wales.

He left to join Merthyr Tydfil in 1964, but returned to Swansea as a coach in 1967, and between 1975 and 1978 was Swansea's manager.

Despite promising performances at the start of the 1977–78 season, Griffiths resigned as manager, doubting his ability to take the club any further. He worked as John Toshack's assistant until his death on 25 April 1978, when he suffered a heart attack prior to the win against Scunthorpe United which the team won 3–1.  The following Saturday they beat Halifax Town 2-0 and clinched promotion to the Third Division.

References

1931 births
1978 deaths
Welsh footballers
Wales international footballers
Swansea City A.F.C. players
Welsh football managers
Association football fullbacks